"Henry James, This One’s For You" is a 2005 science fiction short story by American writer Jack McDevitt.

It was a finalist for the 2006 Nebula Award for Best Short Story.

Plot summary
The story is narrated by Jerry, an editor at a smaller publisher. After receiving an amazing manuscript he contacts the author - only to discover an even more amazing secret.

External links
 Text of the story at SFWA.org

Science fiction short stories
2005 short stories
Works originally published in Subterranean Magazine